North Dakota Highway 297 (ND 297) is a  east-west state highway in the U.S. state of North Dakota. ND 297's western terminus is at Interstate 29 (I-29) in Grand Forks, and the eastern terminus is at U.S. Route 2 Business (US 2 Bus.) in Grand Forks.

Major intersections

References

297
Transportation in Grand Forks County, North Dakota
Grand Forks, North Dakota